Middle Georgia State University is a public university with its main campus in Macon, Georgia. It is part of the University System of Georgia and offers programs to students on five campuses in Middle Georgia and online. Middle Georgia State University is accredited by the Southern Association of Colleges and Schools Commission on Colleges to award associate, baccalaureate, master's, and doctoral degrees. 

The institution, originally known as Middle Georgia State College, was founded in 2013 through the merger of Middle Georgia College and Macon State College. Through these legacy institutions, Middle Georgia State University traces its history to 1884. In 2015, the institution adopted its current name to reflect its elevation to state university status.

History
Middle Georgia State is a relatively new institution in name, though it has been in existence in several forms for most of 130 years.

1884–1919
The institution's beginnings date to the establishment of New Ebenezer College, which occupied the site of the current Cochran Campus. New Ebenezer was established in 1884 by the New Ebenezer Baptist Association, which was composed largely of Baptist churches in Pulaski, Dodge, Laurens, and Telfair counties of Middle Georgia. The first building on the campus was completed in 1886, and classes were first held in 1887 with approximately 100 students. However, the association discontinued its financial support for their namesake college in 1898, forcing the school to close its doors.

The college's building served as a high school for the city of Cochran until 1913, when the high school moved. No documentation exists regarding the facilities from 1913–1919, leading to the presumption that it was unoccupied during that time.

1919–1931
In 1919, the Georgia State College of Agricultural and Mechanic Arts (a division of the University of Georgia) opened a branch dedicated to serving the needs of the 12th Congressional District in the building formerly used by New Ebenezer College. In 1927, the school's name was changed to Middle Georgia Agricultural and Mechanical Junior College, though it remained a branch of the state agricultural school. In 1929, the school's name was changed to Middle Georgia College and responsibility for its operation was given to a nine-person board of trustees.

1931–1965
Middle Georgia College was made an independent institution in 1931 when it was created as one of the original units of the newly created University System of Georgia. During World War II, Middle Georgia hosted the 50th College Training Detachment of the U.S. Army Air Force and graduated 17 classes of aviation students from March 1943 – July 1944.

In 1964, Dr. Louis C. Alderman Jr. became president and served 23 years, the longest term of any president of the college. Many new buildings as well as renovations of existing facilities marked his tenure in growing the college's reputation, academic excellence, campus beauty, and athletic programs. Middle Georgia College continued to operate as a separate unit of the University System until the end of 2012.

1965–1995
In 1968, Macon Junior College was established on the western side of Macon, Georgia. The two year institution began its first year with 1,100 students which was the largest enrollment to this point for a new University System of Georgia institution.

Middle Georgia College opened a Dublin Campus in 1984. In 1987, the Regents removed "Junior" from the Macon college's name, but Macon College remained a two-year school, and in 1991 it began offering classes in a building at an office park in Warner Robins.

1996–2011
In 1996, Macon College was renamed Macon State College. The first bachelor's degrees were awarded in May 1999. With support from the City of Warner Robins and funding from the General Assembly, the college constructed a new building and renovated another to establish a new campus in Warner Robins in 2003.

Middle Georgia College also was expanding. A new program was added in 2007, when the college assumed the programs and facilities that had been the Georgia Aviation Technical College in Eastman. With that consolidation, Middle Georgia College had campuses in Cochran, Dublin and Eastman.

While Middle Georgia College had residence halls, Macon State College, for its first 40 years, was strictly a commuter college. However, units in an apartment building near the campus opened as student housing for the fall 2010 semester.

In 2010, Macon State also became the host of the International Cherry Blossom Festival's annual Tunes and Balloons event.

2011–present
From 2011 to 2015, the two institutions went through dramatic change, beginning in June 2011 when Dr. David Bell ended his 14-year presidency of Macon State. He was replaced in July 2011 by Dr. Jeff Allbritten.

Six months later, in January 2012, the Board of Regents set in motion the consolidation of Macon State College with Middle Georgia College. In May, the Regents decided on a name for the new institution—Middle Georgia State College—and also laid out a path for elevating the consolidated institution to university status after a review process. Allbritten left the presidency after only one year. In July 2012, he was replaced by Dr. John Black, who had retired as president emeritus of East Georgia State College. Black became interim president of Macon State, while Dr. Michael Stoy continued to serve as president of Middle Georgia College.

In the fall of 2012, students at the two colleges selected a new mascot to replace the "Blue Storm" (of Macon State) and the "Warriors" (of Middle Georgia). More than 1,000 students on the campuses of the two legacy institutions voted to select Knights as the new mascot. Students also selected new school colors of purple, black and silver, and they voted among several choices on the design of the new mascot. The new mascot and color selections were at least partially influenced by the two institutions' previous identities. The Blue Storm was depicted as a horse in clouds, while the Warriors were fighting humans. Some students saw the "knight," an armor-wearing fighting soldier often depicted as riding a horse, as a combination of the two former mascots. Selection of the new colors was similarly influenced by the past. The Blue Storm colors were blue and gold; the Warrior colors were red and black. The combination of blue and red form purple, a regal color often worn by knights. Students also proposed many names for the new mascot; the name "Duke" was selected in another student vote.

The Southern Association of Colleges and Schools Commission on Colleges (SACSCOC), the regional accrediting agency, gave its approval to the consolidation of the two colleges in December 2012.

The Board of Regents voted to make the consolidation official, effective immediately, on Jan. 8, 2013. Black was re-appointed as interim president of the new institution, Middle Georgia State College. His term ended in December 2013, and Dr. Christopher Blake assumed the presidency on January 2, 2014.

In March 2015, the Board of Regents approved the elevation of Middle Georgia State to state university status, which took place on July 1, 2015, thus becoming Middle Georgia State University. The university held its first homecoming activities in September 2015. In October, the University announced the expansion of its flight programs previously only offered at the Eastman Campus. The institution is leasing facilities from the Macon-Bibb County Industrial Authority to offer flight courses at the Macon Downtown Airport in east Bibb County.

In December 2015, SACSCOC accredited the University to offer master's degrees, starting in January 2016, and to admit and register students for its new online graduate programs, the Master of Science in Information Technology and the Master of Science in Nursing. More recently the university introduced the Master of Arts in Teaching (Secondary Education), Master of Arts in Technical and Professional Writing, and Master of Science in Management. The university began offering its first doctoral program, the Doctor of Science in Information Technology, in 2021.

Academic programs and organization
The university's academic programs are currently offered by 17 departments in six schools:

The School of Arts and Letters

 Department of English
 Department of History
 Department of Media, Culture, and the Arts

The School of Aviation
 Department of Aviation Maintenance and Structural Technology
 Department of Aviation Science and Management

The School of Business
 Department of Accounting and Finance
 Department of Health Services Administration
 Department of Management and Marketing

The School of Computing
 Department of Information Technology
 Department of Mathematics and Statistics

The School of Education and Behavioral Sciences
 Department of Political Science
Department of Psychology and Criminal Justice
Department of Teacher Education and Social Work

The School of Health and Natural Sciences

 Department of Natural Sciences
Department of Nursing
 Department of Rehabilitation Science
 Department of Respiratory Therapy

The university offers doctorate's, master's, bachelor's, and associate degrees, along with a limited number of certificates.

Several of the university's academic programs have earned accreditation from national agencies:

 The School of Education has been accredited by the National Council for Accreditation of Teacher Education (NCATE) and the Georgia Professional Standards Commission (GaPSC)
 The bachelor's in information technology has been accredited by the Computing Accreditation Commission of ABET
 The master’s, bachelor's and associate's in nursing has been accredited by the Accreditation Commission for Education in Nursing (ACEN)
 The associate's in occupational therapy assistant has been accredited by the Accreditation Council for Occupational Therapy Education (ACOTE) of the American Occupational Therapy Association (AOTA)
 The associate's in respiratory therapy has been accredited by the Commission on Accreditation for Respiratory Care (CoARC)

The university also operates the Georgia Academy (formerly known as GAMES), a two-year non-residential/commuter Dual Enrollment program that prepares high school students for the academic rigor of higher education - specializing in a STEM discipline. This program was previously a residential, two year program based on the Cochran campus.

Study abroad
Students at Middle Georgia State have the opportunity to study abroad through the University System's European Council, which seeks to foster greater understanding and appreciation of the cultures and societies of Europe. The EC sponsors summer study abroad programs for USG students and transients at seven locations in Europe that last 2–5 weeks. Courses are taught largely by faculty from USG colleges and universities and students, blending classroom experiences with group and individual travel as they earn academic credit at their home institution.

Honors Program
The Honors Program at Middle Georgia State is designed to help academically advanced undergraduate students develop their potential through challenging educational activities. Its main goal is to encourage these students in individual, rational, and creative thinking and better prepare them for graduate school. Honors students have small classes with the university's finest professors, and students have opportunities to travel with their professors to research libraries, museums and theaters, and formal academic conferences.

Athletics

The Middle Georgia State athletic teams are called the Knights. The university is a member of the National Association of Intercollegiate Athletics (NAIA), primarily competing in the Southern States Athletic Conference (SSAC; formerly known as Georgia–Alabama–Carolina Conference (GACC) until after the 2003–04 school year) since the 2014–15 academic year. The Knights previously competed in the Georgia Collegiate Athletic Association (GCAA) of the National Junior College Athletic Association (NJCAA) during the 2013–14 academic year (the only season after becoming the Knights, before competing in such leagues as the Middle Georgia College Warriors).

Middle Georgia State competes in ten intercollegiate varsity sports: Men's sports include baseball, basketball, soccer and tennis; while women's sports include basketball, cross country, soccer, softball, tennis & volleyball.

In the fall of 2016, the university added women's volleyball and women's cross country. Those teams compete on the Macon campus, along with the men's and women's tennis teams. While the rest of the facilities for the other sports (men's and women's basketball, baseball, softball, and men's and women's soccer) are hosted on the Cochran campus.

The university also fields a club football team, which competes as a member of the National Club Football Association and a club equestrian team (IHSA).

Notes

Nickname and mascot 
In the fall of 2012, students at the two colleges selected a new mascot to replace the Blue Storm (of Macon State) and the Warriors (of Middle Georgia). More than 1,000 students on the campuses of the two legacy institutions voted to select Knights as the new mascot. Students also selected new school colors of purple, black and silver, and they voted among several choices on the design of the new mascot. The new mascot and color selections were at least partially influenced by the two institutions' previous identities. The Blue Storm was depicted as a horse in clouds, while the Warriors were fighting humans. Some students saw the "knight," an armor-wearing fighting soldier often depicted as riding a horse, as a combination of the two former mascots. Selection of the new colors was similarly influenced by the past. The Blue Storm colors were blue and gold; the Warrior colors were red and black. The combination of blue and red form purple, a regal color often worn by knights. Students also proposed many names for the new mascot; the name "Duke" was selected in another student vote.

Sports sponsored

Baseball 

The Middle Georgia baseball program is one of the winningest programs in the United States, with an overall record of 2140-714 since 1967. The program's overall winningest percentage of .749 is among the highest of any program in the United States.

There have been 136 players from Middle Georgia drafted in the MLB Draft, which ranks third among all colleges & universities in Georgia—only Georgia & Georgia Tech have had more. There have been 7 first round draft picks & 44 total top-five-round draft picks out of Middle Georgia. 20 players from Middle Georgia have reached the major leagues, including Andy Abad, Barret Browning, Kal Daniels, Glenn Davis, Jody Davis, Tom Dunbar, Terry Evans ,Mike Fitzgerald, Willie Harris, Shawn Hillegas, Garey Ingram, Jim Leyritz, Larry Littleton, Warren Newson, Josh Reddick, Ernie Riles, Ray Stephens, Jeff Treadway, Matt Turner, & J.B. Wendelken.

Middle Georgia College (1967-2013)

The MGC Warrior baseball team won four NJCAA national championships: 1979, 1980, 1982, &1995.

The team reached the JUCO World Series 13 times: 1975, 1980, 1982, 1983, 1984, 1990, 1995, 1996, 2001, 2002, 2004, &  2009.

The Warriors won 38 division or conference championships.

Macon State College (1967-2013)

Middle Georgia State University (2014-present)

Since joining the NAIA, the MGA baseball team has made an NAIA regional 4 years: 2017, 2018, 2019, & 2021.

The Knights won their first SSAC conference championship in 2017 & won their first SSAC tournament championship in 2018.

Campuses
As of fall semester 2020, the combined enrollment of Middle Georgia State was 8,404.

The university has five campuses and one off-campus instructional site in the following locations:

Macon 

The  Macon Campus is the university's main campus, located in the western section of Bibb County at Interstate 475's interchange with U.S. Route 80 (Eisenhower Parkway). It was the original main campus of Macon State College. The campus has more than a dozen major buildings and a scenic lake. A new recreation and wellness facility, which includes state-of-the-art fitness equipment and a lazy river, opened in the spring of 2014. The campus currently has two student dormitories, University Pointe and Lakeview Pointe, each with more than 300 beds.

The Macon Campus is the home of the university's men's and women's tennis teams, and the women's cross country and volleyball teams.

The Macon Campus is also home to the university's music program.

Cochran 

This historic campus of  dates back to 1884 and is shaded, scenic, and traditional, with a lake and stately white-columned classroom buildings. This was the original main campus of Middle Georgia College. The Cochran Campus has a wellness and recreation center, an outdoor pool, dining facilities, an on-campus health center, and different styles of student dormitories with more than 1,100 beds.

Campus specific programs include Occupational Therapy, Sports Management, and Rehabilitation Science.

The Cochran Campus is home to many of the university's intercollegiate athletic facilities:
 Stuckey Field (baseball)
 Morris Gymnasium (basketball)
 NeSmith Field (soccer)
 Knight Field (softball)
The newest club sport at MGA, club equestrian, holds their practices at the Middle Georgia Equestrian Center in Cochran. Students from all five campuses are encouraged to participate. This club was acknowledged by House Representative Bubber Epps who presented the club with a state proclamation.

Dublin 

The  Dublin Campus is the healthcare degree program hub. The campus includes a library, classrooms, computer labs, and an annex. In 2023, a planned Campus expansion was announced, which included two large nursing lecture classrooms, a 20-bed hospital laboratory, a 3-bed nursing simulation lab, a technologically enhanced observation room that would connect to the simulation room.

Eastman 

The  Eastman Campus is home to the University's School of Aviation. It is the only campus in the University System of Georgia that includes flight training and airport management programs, and is adjacent to the Heart of Georgia Regional Airport. In a future expansion, the School of Aviation plans to begin offering new programs in Aviation Science and Management with tracks in Aerospace Logistics and Aviation Maintenance Management. There is one, 140-bed student housing facility on the Eastman Campus: Aviation Hall.

Warner Robins 

The  Warner Robins Campus is located one-half mile west of the main gate of Robins Air Force Base. Three academic buildings are now in place: Thomas Hall, the Academic Services Building, and Oak Hall. The campus facilities include a bookstore, recreation/fitness center, and cafe. The campus is situated adjacent to the Nola Brantley Memorial Library. The Warner Robins campus is now home to the Georgia Academy (starting in 2023).

Instructional site 
In addition to programs on its five campuses and online, Middle Georgia State University offers a Certificate in Film Production, with classes taught at Trilith Studios Stages (formerly Pinewood Atlanta Studios) in Fayette County, Georgia.

Greek life
The university started hosting Greek organizations in the fall 2015 semester, including fraternities and sororities.

Fraternities 
Alpha Phi Alpha
Phi Beta Sigma
Kappa Sigma

Alma mater
With the creation of a new university, Director of Bands, Alan Clark, commissioned the creation of a new Alma Mater. He turned to renowned composer Robert W. Smith of Troy, Alabama to write the music and lyrics, with input on the words from the university's top administrators. The song is titled "Knights of Truth and Honor." The music was played for the first time by the Band of Knights, and sung for the first time by the MGA Chamber Singers at the inauguration of President Christopher Blake on Oct. 17, 2014.

Notable alumni 

 Andrico Hines, Arena Football League player
 Josh Reddick, Major League Baseball player
 George Thornewell Smith, politician
 Jerry Zulli, college baseball coach
 Terry Evans, Major League Baseball player
 Emory Gordy Jr., musician/producer
Kal Daniels, American baseball player
Andy Abad (Tulile), American baseball player
Ernest Riles, Major League Baseball player
Tonya Butler, American college football player (First female to earn a football scholarship at a state school)
Tom Dunbar, Major League Baseball player
Barret Browning, Major League Baseball player
Kevin Young, American basketball coach
 Jeff Treadway, Major League Baseball player
 Jody Davis, Major League Baseball player
 Jim Leyritz, Major League Baseball player
 J. B. Wendelken, Major League Baseball player
 Matt Turner, Major League Baseball player
 Ray Stephens, Major League Baseball player
 Warren Newson, Major League Baseball player
 Larry Littleton, Major League Baseball player
 Garey Ingram, Major League Baseball player
 Shawn Hillegas, Major League Baseball player
 Willie Harris, Major League Baseball player
 Mike Fitzgerald, Major League Baseball player
 David Perno, college baseball coach
 Manny Mantrana, college baseball coach
 Scott Forbes, college baseball coach
 Tony Cruz, Major League Baseball player
Will Pettis, Arena Football Hall of Fame player
Antonio Cochran, National Football League player

Points of interest
 Waddell Barnes Botanical Gardens
 Museum of Technology
 Terry L. Coleman Museum and Archives

References

External links

 
 Official athletics website

Public universities and colleges in Georgia (U.S. state)
Education in Bleckley County, Georgia
Middle Georgia College
Southern States Athletic Conference
Buildings and structures in Bleckley County, Georgia
Education in Dodge County, Georgia
Education in Laurens County, Georgia
Universities and colleges in Macon, Georgia
Education in Houston County, Georgia
Buildings and structures in Houston County, Georgia
Warner Robins, Georgia
Universities and colleges formed by merger in the United States
2013 establishments in Georgia (U.S. state)
Educational institutions established in 2013